Briel-sur-Barse (literally Briel on Barse) is a commune in the Aube department in north-central France.

Geography
The Barse flows through the commune.

Population

See also
Communes of the Aube department
Parc naturel régional de la Forêt d'Orient

References

Communes of Aube
Aube communes articles needing translation from French Wikipedia